Fc receptor-like protein 5 is a protein that in humans is encoded by the FCRL5 gene. FCRL5 has also been designated as CD307 (cluster of differentiation 307).

References

Further reading

External links
 

Clusters of differentiation
Fc receptors